Drayton Entertainment is a not-for-profit professional theatre company based in Southwestern Ontario operating seven venues across the province: the original Drayton Festival Theatre in Drayton, Huron Country Playhouse and Playhouse II in Grand Bend, King's Wharf Theatre in Penetanguishene, Schoolhouse Theatre in St. Jacobs, St. Jacobs Country Playhouse in Waterloo, and Hamilton Family Theatre Cambridge (formerly Dunfield Theatre Cambridge) in Cambridge.

Alex Mustakas is the founding and current Artistic Director.

Since its foundation in 1991 Drayton Entertainment has grown from a grassroots theatre, into one of the most successful and admired theatre companies in the country, attracting top talent from across North America.

Over 25 years of performances have included musicals, comedies, and dramas.

Theatres

Drayton Festival Theatre (Drayton, Ontario) 

The tiny village of Drayton is 30 minutes north of Kitchener-Waterloo. Built in 1902, the former Town Hall has a rich history of entertaining audiences with such legendary performers as Beatrice Lillie. The building also housed the town offices and eventually became a complete municipal complex, which included town offices, council chambers, library, fire hall, automobile repair shop and jail.

By the 1980s, the theatre was used infrequently, but was revived in 1983 by a group of area residents interested in amateur productions. The Drayton Community Players staged two shows each year until the theatre was closed for safety reasons in 1989. Determined to save their historic theatre from destruction, all 1,000 Drayton residents rallied together and raised $110,000 to retrofit the facility.

In 1990, the theatre reopened for public use and The Drayton Festival Theatre Inc. was formed with a mission to "promote, produce, and present professional theatre of the highest artistic standards, and to function as facilitator for other cultural and educational activities."  Alex Mustakas was hired as the Artistic Director – a position he has held ever since.

Mustakas enlisted the help of widely respected Canadian director/choreographer Alan Lund to produce the first show of the 1991 season. Vaudeville! brought the Drayton Festival Theatre to life on Canada Day, July 1, 1991.  The first season consisted of three productions over nine weeks and attracted 14,592 visitors to the village.  A tiny budget necessitated plenty of creativity as well as volunteer and community involvement – from front of house managers and ushers, to laundry and technical support.

A great deal of attention was generated when The Drayton Festival Theatre made Canadian theatrical history by completely selling out both its 1993 and 1994 seasons. All 36,000 available seats for the 1994 season were sold one month prior to the beginning of rehearsals.

As the popularity of The Drayton Festival Theatre grew, so did each season and by 1996, the season expanded to 21 weeks with an overall attendance record of 62,660.

St. Jacobs Schoolhouse Theatre (St. Jacobs) 

Eager to see if the winning Drayton formula could be replicated in another community, the company launched a second stage in the village of St. Jacobs, in the heart of Mennonite Country in 1997. The Schoolhouse Theatre in St. Jacobs is a renovated schoolhouse that was originally built in 1867. In the fall of 2019, the Mersynergy Charitable Foundation donated the building to Drayton Entertainment.

The inaugural production was the musical Forever Plaid, which sold all of its 25,000 available seats.  Sold-out performances continued in 1998 with the whodunit Shear Madness – in fact, seats had to be added for most performances to meet demand for tickets, resulting in an overall attendance record of 110 percent.

For the 2000 season, Drayton brought the musical A Closer Walk With Patsy Cline to the St. Jacobs stage. All previous attendance records were broken, as more than 31,000 theatregoers were entertained during the 7-month season.

King’s Wharf Theatre (Penetanguishene) 

In January 1999, newspaper headlines heralded the news that the Drayton Festival Theatre had been chosen by the Ontario Government to assume operation of the King's Wharf Theatre in Penetanguishene.  Situated on the shore of Georgian Bay and flanked by tall ships and historic buildings, the King's Wharf Theatre is nestled within Discovery Harbour, an original nineteenth century British naval and military base.

The King's Wharf Theatre inaugural production was the musical Me and My Girl. When the 11-week season closed on September 4, 1999, the King's Wharf Theatre had welcomed more than 20,000 visitors.  This once again demonstrated that Drayton Entertainment's unique business model could flourish at other locations.

Huron Country Playhouse Mainstage and South Huron Stage (Grand Bend) 

At a press conference on May 25, 2000 the Drayton Festival Theatre and Huron Country Playhouse announced a merger between the two organizations, creating one new company – Drayton Entertainment.

Huron Country Playhouse launched its 1972 inaugural season in a rented big-top tent while actors and staff lived and worked out of the century-old barn.  Audiences are now entertained on two separate stages – the 660-seat Playhouse and 300-seat South Huron Stage.

Today, Huron Country Playhouse is one of the outstanding success stories in Canadian theatre proudly celebrating more than four decades of entertainment.  Beyond its obvious cultural and artistic benefits, are the equally important local economic benefits, which generate millions in revenues for the region and the Grand Bend community.  During the summer months from June to September, the Playhouse is one of the area's largest employers, creating over 120 jobs.

St. Jacobs Country Playhouse (Waterloo) 

In October 2004, Drayton Entertainment officially announced it would be expanding its operations in Waterloo with a new state-of-the-art performance facility that would be housed in the vacant St. Jacobs Winery & Cidery. With its turn-of-the-century style masonry and heavy timber accents, the building was an ideal setting for the new 400-seat St. Jacobs Country Playhouse.

The success of the Schoolhouse Theatre in St. Jacobs and support of the new St. Jacobs venue, coupled with the obvious business increases for local retail and hospitality operations, led to the discussion of creating a larger custom-designed theatre on the border of St. Jacobs and the city of Waterloo. The benefits of expansion in this market were numerous, including additional work for artists and administrative staff, potential for new marketing initiatives and national sponsorships.

The St. Jacobs Country Playhouse offers a variety of performances year-round, as well as providing performance space as a resource to the community. The theatre opened in the fall of 2005 with Disney's Beauty and the Beast – completing selling out all 25,000 tickets available for the 8-week run.

Hamilton Family Theatre Cambridge (Cambridge) 

In 2009, Cambridge City Council passed a resolution for the development and construction of a 500-seat performing arts venue in the heart of Old Galt, to be operated by Drayton Entertainment. This complex also houses Drayton Entertainment's centralized administration and production facilities. The Dunfield Theatre Cambridge opened in the spring of 2013 with Mary Poppins. Funding partners include the Government of Canada, Government of Ontario, the Corporation of the City of Cambridge, and Drayton Entertainment. Cambridge taxpayers paid $6 million, both the federal and city of Cambridge governments paid the same, Drayton Entertainment gave $4.5 million to the project and continually cover daily costs.

In July 2017, Cambridge city council approved a name change for the theatre that took effect in January 2018. Shiplake Properties assumed the original naming rights for the theatre in 2013, as a brand extension of the Dunfield Retirement Residence, a $30 million modern senior retirement living complex located in the Saginaw Parkway and Light Drive neighbourhood.  The Toronto-based company sold the building to Revera in the summer of 2017, and it was subsequently renamed Granite Landing.  The naming rights for the Cambridge theatre did not transfer with the new ownership.

The Hamilton Family initially contributed $500,000 in 2013 during the theatre's inaugural season, in exchange for naming the auditorium.  In 2017, John and Terry Hamilton pledged another $500,000 to assume the exclusive 20-year venue naming rights, valued at $1 million. The theatre has been named the Hamilton Family Theatre Cambridge since January 2018.

Youth Musical Theatre Program 
The Drayton Entertainment Youth Musical Theatre Program is an auditioned training program designed to cultivate community, encourage leadership, ignite imagination, and boost confidence, while providing aspiring young performers with the opportunity to learn from professional theatre artists and develop a deeper appreciation for live performance. Students train with passionate industry professionals in singing, dancing, acting, audition technique and technical theatre. The Youth Musical Theatre Program is overseen by Associate Artistic Director  David Connolly.

Awards 
Drayton Entertainment has received 6 Lieutenant Governor's Awards for the Arts – a prestigious honour given to arts organizations that exemplify outstanding private sector and community support.

Media Coverage 
 The Globe and Mail -  May 21, 2013
The Globe and Mail -  July 6, 2013
The Record -  May 30, 2015
The Record -  January 31, 2018
Toronto Star -  January 2, 2019

External links

Drayton Entertainment theatres
Drayton Festival Theatre
Hamilton Family Theatre Cambridge
Huron Country Playhouse
Huron Country Playhouse II
King’s Wharf Theatre
St. Jacobs Country Playhouse
St. Jacobs Schoolhouse Theatre

General
Facebook | Drayton Entertainment
 Twitter | Drayton Entertainment
Instagram | Drayton Entertainment
YouTube | Drayton Entertainment

References 

Theatre companies in Ontario